Yelena Ivanovna Ruzina (born 3 April 1964 in Voronezh) is a retired athlete who competed mainly in the 400 metres. She represented the Soviet Union and later, Russia.

She competed for Commonwealth of Independent States at the 1992 Summer Olympics held in Barcelona, Spain in the 4 x 400 metres where she won the gold medal with her team mates Lyudmila Dzhigalova, Olga Nazarova, and 400 metres silver medalist Olga Bryzgina. She won another relay gold medal at the 1995 IAAF World Indoor Championships.

References

1964 births
Living people
Sportspeople from Voronezh
Russian female sprinters
Soviet female sprinters
Olympic female sprinters
Olympic athletes of the Unified Team
Olympic gold medalists for the Unified Team
Olympic gold medalists in athletics (track and field)
Athletes (track and field) at the 1992 Summer Olympics
Medalists at the 1992 Summer Olympics
Goodwill Games medalists in athletics
Competitors at the 1990 Goodwill Games
Competitors at the 1994 Goodwill Games
World Athletics Championships athletes for Russia
World Athletics Championships medalists
World Athletics Indoor Championships winners
European Athletics Championships medalists
Russian Athletics Championships winners